Perotti is an Italian surname. Notable people with the surname include:

Angelica Le Gru Perotti (1719–1776), Italian painter
Diego Perotti (born 1988), Argentine footballer
Fulvia Miani Perotti (1844-1931), Italian writer
Giovanni Domenico Perotti (1761–1825), Italian composer
José Perotti Ronzoni (1898–1956), Chilean sculptor
Niccolò Perotti (1429–1480), Italian humanist and author

Italian-language surnames
Surnames from given names